The Javells were a British Northern soul group led by Stephen Jameson (born 1949, London, England), an English musician. Jameson had previously recorded solo for Pye and Dawn in the 1970s, under his own name, as well as under the stage name Nosmo King (No Smoking! - a name also used by a musical hall act of the 1920s). Jameson was best known for the single "Teenage Love", from which the B-side "Goodbye Nothing To Say" was identified by Pye's Disco for reworking by The Javells.  They reached No. 26 in the UK Singles Chart during late 1974.

References

Northern soul musicians